Scott Antel Ambush is an American musician, best known as the bass player of jazz fusion band Spyro Gyra.

Biography
He was born April 28, 1960 in Frederick, Maryland to Webster and Jeanette Lofton Ambush. He attended Urbana Elementary School in Urbana, Maryland, West Frederick Middle, and Frederick High School. After high school, he attended the University of Maryland at College Park. While studying psychology during the day, he was introduced to the Washington, D.C. music scene at night.
Through word of mouth, he was recommended for the bass job with Spyro Gyra and filled the bass space after audition. He made his studio debut with Spyro Gyra in 1992 on the album "Three Wishes".

Discography

Albums (with Spyro Gyra)

Albums (with Mindset)

References

External links
 Scott Ambush
 Scott Ambush Myspace

1960 births
20th-century American bass guitarists
Living people
People from Frederick, Maryland
Jazz musicians from Maryland
Guitarists from Maryland
Spyro Gyra members
University of Maryland, College Park alumni